The 2016 Alaska Republican presidential caucuses took place on March 1, 2016 as part of "Super Tuesday." Senator Cruz won the state's caucuses by less than 1,000 votes, despite Mr. Trump enjoying the support of former Governor and 2008 Vice Presidential nominee Sarah Palin, the 9th Governor of Alaska.

While Cruz performed best in the state's urban legislative districts, Trump won rural precincts in the Alaska Bush. Alaska was the only state where Ben Carson carried a jurisdiction over the course of the primary, which was a jurisdiction which is one of the least populated in the United States.

Polling

Results 

Delegates were awarded to candidates who got 13% or more of the vote proportionally.

Controversy 
At the Republican National Convention, Alaska's floor votes were all recorded for Donald Trump by the convention secretary, even though the Alaska delegation read their votes according to the results of the caucuses- 12 for Cruz, 11 for Trump and 5 for Rubio. An Alaska delegate challenged the results as recorded. However, RNC chair Reince Priebus defended the actions of the convention secretary, saying that the delegates were bound to Trump.

References 

Alaska
Alaska Republican caucuses
2016 Alaska elections
March 2016 events in the United States